The Somosomo Strait is the strait that separates Taveuni island and Vanua Levu in Fiji.  It is known for its soft coral and is a popular diving location.

References 

Bodies of water of Fiji
Straits of Oceania